Icon Towers is a multi functional complex of two under construction skyscraper, named as Icon Tower 1 and 2 at Setiabudi, South Jakarta, Indonesia. This is a mixed complex for hotel, residence and office. Tower 1 has 77 floors and 350 meters height, where as Tower 2 has 55 floors and 200+ meter height. The complex has a podium of 15 floors to connect two tower. The complex was expected to be completed by 2019.

See also
 List of tallest buildings in Indonesia
 List of tallest buildings in Jakarta

References

External links
 Building at The Skyscraper Center database 
 Building at Emporis database

Towers in Indonesia
Buildings and structures in Jakarta
Skyscrapers in Indonesia
Skyscraper office buildings in Indonesia